Livewire 1350 (more commonly referred to as simply Livewire) is a student radio station run by students of the University of East Anglia in Norwich, Norfolk. The station is part of the UEA Media Collective, which consists of Concrete (student newspaper) and UEA:TV.

History
Livewire began broadcasting in 1990, making it one of the longest-running student radio stations in the UK. It was launched by John Peel.

In 2016, the station was rebranded with a new logo and website.

Structure

Livewire broadcasts online and in the University's coffee shop, Unio, from 08:00–00:00 on weekdays, and 09:00–00:00 on weekends.

Famous alumni
Greg James - BBC Radio 1 DJ
Jay Lawrence - Absolute Radio DJ
Issy Panayis - Radio X DJ
Georgie Shackleton - Passerby 16, Deep Water (ITV)

References

University of East Anglia
Student radio in the United Kingdom